Guillermo Segurado (born 2 October 1946) is an Argentine rower. He competed at the 1968 Summer Olympics and the 1972 Summer Olympics.

References

1946 births
Living people
Argentine male rowers
Olympic rowers of Argentina
Rowers at the 1968 Summer Olympics
Rowers at the 1972 Summer Olympics
Sportspeople from Rosario, Santa Fe
Pan American Games medalists in rowing
Pan American Games gold medalists for Argentina
Pan American Games silver medalists for Argentina
Rowers at the 1967 Pan American Games
Rowers at the 1971 Pan American Games